Siddharth Saraf (born 16 October 1992) is an Indian cricketer who plays for Rajasthan. He made his Twenty20 debut for Rajasthan in the 2018–19 Syed Mushtaq Ali Trophy on 2 March 2019.

References

External links
 

1992 births
Living people
Indian cricketers
Rajasthan cricketers
Cricketers from Jaipur